Tunisia competed at the 2014 Summer Youth Olympics, in Nanjing, China from 16 August to 28 August 2014.

Medalists

Athletics

Tunisia qualified six athletes.

Qualification Legend: Q=Final A (medal); qB=Final B (non-medal); qC=Final C (non-medal); qD=Final D (non-medal); qE=Final E (non-medal)

Boys
Track & road events

Field events

Girls
Track & road events

Basketball

Tunisia qualified a boys' team based on the 1 June 2014 FIBA 3x3 National Federation Rankings.

Skills competition

Boys' tournament

Roster
 Ahmed Dhif
 Mahmoud Hajri
 Ghassen Majdoub
 Monem Soltani

Group stage

L16-finals

Knockout stage

Boxing

Tunisia qualified one boxer based on its performance at the 2014 AIBA Youth World Championships

Boys

Fencing

Tunisia qualified one athlete based on its performance at the 2014 FIE Cadet World Championships.

Boys

Mixed team

Gymnastics

Artistic gymnastics

Tunisia qualified one athlete based on its performance at the 2014 African Artistic Gymnastics Championships.

Girls

Handball

Tunisia qualified one team based on its performance at the 2014 African Men's Youth Handball Championship.

Boys' tournament

Roster

 Mehdi Ammar
 Ahmed Ayari
 Anouar Ben Abdallah
 Jihad Ben Araar
 Marwen Ben Dhia
 Yassine Bouteffaha
 Oussama Ghachem
 Mustapha Haj Romdhane
 Mohamed Jaouhar Hamed
 Mohamed Ghazi Memmich
 Wael Mzoughi
 Wael Saadallah
 Ghassen Toumi
 Mohamed Hamza Zouaoui

Group stage

Placement Match 5-6

Judo

Tunisia qualified one athlete based on its performance at the 2013 Cadet World Judo Championships.

Individual

Team

Rowing

Tunisia qualified two boats based on its performance at the African Qualification Regatta.

Qualification Legend: FA=Final A (medal); FB=Final B (non-medal); FC=Final C (non-medal); FD=Final D (non-medal); SA/B=Semifinals A/B; SC/D=Semifinals C/D; R=Repechage

Rugby sevens

Tunisia qualified a girls' team based on its performance at the 2013 Rugby World Cup Sevens.

Girls' tournament
Roster

 Islem Abdallah
 Lina Bennour
 Ons Boudokhane
 Samira Dhahri
 Dorsaf Dhouibi
 Faten Dorai
 Oumayma Dziri
 Imen Ellili
 Safa Gandouz
 Ines Hamdi
 Amira Letaief
 Khouthar Nasr

Group stage

Placing 5-6

Sailing

Tunisia qualified one boat based on its performance at the Techno 293 African Continental Qualifiers.

Swimming

Tunisia qualified two swimmers.

Boys

Table Tennis

Tunisia qualified one athlete based on its performance at the African Qualification Event.

Singles

Team

Qualification Legend: Q=Main Bracket (medal); qB=Consolation Bracket (non-medal)

Weightlifting

Tunisia qualified 1 quota in the boys' and girls' events based on the team ranking after the 2014 Weightlifting Junior & Youth African Championships.

Boys

Girls

Wrestling

Tunisia qualified two athletes based on its performance at the 2014 African Cadet Championships.

Boys

References

2014 in Tunisian sport
Nations at the 2014 Summer Youth Olympics
Tunisia at the Youth Olympics